Moulton is a town in Lavaca County, Texas, United States. The population was 854 at the 2020 census.

Location

Demographics

As of the 2020 United States census, there were 854 people, 369 households, and 224 families residing in the town.

As of the census of 2000, there were 944 people, 383 households, and 243 families residing in the town. The population density was 1,147.2 people per square mile (444.5/km2). There were 451 housing units at an average density of 548.1 per square mile (212.4/km2). The racial makeup of the town was 95.87% White, 0.74% African American, 0.11% Asian, 2.33% from other races, and 0.95% from two or more races. Hispanic or Latino of any race were 13.14% of the population.

There were 383 households, out of which 30.0% had children under the age of 18 living with them, 52.5% were married couples living together, 9.1% had a female householder with no husband present, and 36.3% were non-families. 32.9% of all households were made up of individuals, and 24.0% had someone living alone who was 65 years of age or older. The average household size was 2.31 and the average family size was 2.97.

In the town, the population was spread out, with 23.3% under the age of 18, 6.8% from 18 to 24, 22.5% from 25 to 44, 19.8% from 45 to 64, and 27.6% who were 65 years of age or older. The median age was 43 years. For every 100 females, there were 89.9 males. For every 100 females age 18 and over, there were 79.2 males.

The median income for a household in the town was $27,865, and the median income for a family was $34,688. Males had a median income of $23,125 versus $18,971 for females. The per capita income for the town was $16,284. About 7.7% of families and 13.8% of the population were below the poverty line, including 14.0% of those under age 18 and 20.9% of those age 65 or over.

Education
The town is served by the Moulton Independent School District.

Media and journalism

Area newspapers
 The Moulton Eagle

References

External links

Towns in Lavaca County, Texas
Towns in Texas